Secretary Island is an island in southwestern New Zealand, lying entirely within Fiordland National Park. Roughly triangular in shape, it lies between Doubtful Sound / Patea in the south and Te Awa-o-Tū / Thompson Sound in the north, with its west coast facing the Tasman Sea. To the east of the island, Pendulo Reach connects Te Awa-o-Tū / Thompson Sound with Doubtful Sound / Patea. Steeply sloped, the entirely bush-clad island rises to a chain of several peaks higher than 1000 metres. The highest of these is the  Mount Grono, the highest peak in the main New Zealand chain not located in the North or South Island. The island also contains three lakes.

Its isolation and size make Secretary Island one of the most important islands in New Zealand for the conservation efforts of vulnerable native species.  The island was never inhabited by possums or rodents, and by 2007, deer and stoat were eradicated as well, making it the largest completely pest-free island in New Zealand.

With the removal of deer, the complete native ecosystem is thriving, with plants from ground covers through to trees supporting a healthy population of native animals from insects and spiders to native birds.  Transferred populations of endangered birds in particular have been recovering thanks to the absence of rats and mice.

Pest eradication
Between 2004 and 2008, the New Zealand Department of Conservation engaged in a project to eradicate pests from the island, to help protect native species found on the island. This was the largest Fiordland island targeted to achieve pest-free status, with the project aiming to eradicate deer and stoat, the only remaining animal pests present on Secretary Island at the time.

The deer population on Secretary Island was estimated at more than 700 as recently as 2006, before the eradication project reduced their numbers to a handful of deer that have still evaded capture. The removal of deer contributes significantly to the regeneration of native plants, which in turn helps support the endangered native species on the island as part of the natural process of restoration of the island's ecosystem.

From 2004 onwards, a network of stoat traps has been created on the island, connected via tramping tracks cut through the bush. The removal of stoats will provide significant protection for native species already present on the island, such as the Fiordland crested penguin, New Zealand falcon, kākā, kiwi and kākāriki.  Becoming a stoat-free sanctuary would also allow the re-introduction of other species no longer found on the mainland, such as the Fiordland skink and kākāpō.

Recovery of endangered native animals
The absence of rodents allows an abundant population of native invertebrates to thrive, including the critically endangered knobbled weevil.

In 2008, 25 New Zealand rock wrens were translocated onto Secretary Island, with excellent results. A search by DoC rangers two years later found twelve unbanded rock wrens, confirming that natural breeding started to occur shortly after the translocation. Sixteen more birds were transferred in 2010. With its southern location and many areas over 1000 metres above sea level, Secretary Island is the most suitable offshore island for these alpine birds, as it offers the harsh alpine areas they prefer. On the mainland, rock wren are threatened by introduced predators.

27 North Island kōkako have also been moved to Secretary Island in 2008.

One of the largest relocations was the transfer of up to 60 yellowheads (mohua) caught in the Dart Valley and flown to Secretary Island to establish a population of these rare birds in a rat-free environment. The number of birds is sufficiently high to ensure adequate genetic diversity.

Other native birds transferred to the island following the eradication of stoat are South Island robin in 2008, and takahē in 2009.

Secretary Island is the only known locality of the New Zealand endemic moth species Sabatinca pluvialis.

Public Access
Secretary Island has been identified as a potential "Open Sanctuary" under the Fiordland National Park Draft Management Plan, which means that while it is protected, open access to the public would still be permitted. However, the island may be closed temporarily during the restoration project for stoat and deer control.

As with all of New Zealand's offshore conservation islands, visitors are expected to be diligent in ensuring they do not carry unwanted plant or animal pests onto Secretary Island via clothing, bags or equipment.

Blanket Bay on the southeast coast of the island has a small island in it with a wharf and a hut used for refuelling and supply by fishermen. A waterfall plunging from Secretary Island into the bay has been used in the past as a handy supply of fresh water.

The waters between the two islands are protected by the Te Awaatu Channel (The Gut) Marine Reserve. Doubtful Sound tour boats routinely travel through this channel, providing the public with an easy way to see this remote island up-close.

A radio repeater is located on Mt Grono, the highest point on the island, to provide communication coverage for boat operators in and around the Fiordland coast.

Earthquake
Secretary Island was the epicentre of the 2003 Fiordland earthquake and an earlier earthquake in 1993.

See also

 Secretary Islands
 Island restoration
 List of islands of New Zealand
 List of islands
 Desert island

References

External links

Secretary Island – Department of Conservation

Uninhabited islands of New Zealand
Islands of Fiordland
Fiordland National Park